The Love Trap may refer to:

The Love Trap (1923 film), American film
The Love Trap (1925 film), German film
The Love Trap (1929 film), American film